The Battle of Toulon, also known as the Battle of Cape Sicié, took place between 21 and 22 February 1744 NS near the French Mediterranean port of Toulon. Although France was not yet at war with Great Britain, ships from their Levant Fleet combined with a Spanish force, which had been trapped in Toulon for two years, to break the blockade imposed by the British Mediterranean Fleet.

The initial engagement on 21 February was largely indecisive and the British continued their pursuit until midday on 22nd before their commander, Admiral Thomas Mathews, called off the chase. With several of his ships in need of repair, he withdrew to Menorca, which meant the Royal Navy temporarily lost control of the waters around Italy and allowed the Spanish to take the offensive against Savoy.

In his report, Mathews blamed his subordinate Richard Lestock for the failure and the issue was hotly debated in Parliament. At the subsequent court-martial, Mathews was held responsible and dismissed from the navy in June 1747, while Lestock's political connections meant he was cleared of all charges. Another seven captains were removed from command for failing to engage the enemy and the investigation led to changes that required individual captains to be far more aggressive.

Order of battle

4 frigates, 4 fire ships

Footnotes

References

Sources
 
 
 
 

Orders of battle